Tungao's slender skink (Brachymeles tungaoi) is a species of skinks found in the Philippines, in the Scincidae family.

Distribution 
This species is endemic from the island of Masbate in Philippines.

Etymology 
This species is named in honor of Jason B. "Tungao" Fernandez.

Original publication 
Cameron D. Siler and Rafe M. Brown "Phylogeny-based Species Delimitation in Philippine Slender Skinks (Reptilia: Squamata: Scincidae: Brachymeles): Taxonomic Revision of Pentadactyl Species Groups and Description of Three New Species," Herpetological Monographs 24(1), 1–54, (1 December 2010). https://doi.org/10.1655/HERPMONOGRAPHS-D-10-00003.1

External links 
 http://reptile-database.reptarium.cz/species?genus=Brachymeles&species=tungaoi

Notes and references 

Brachymeles
Endemic fauna of the Philippines
Reptiles of the Philippines